James Rhea Massengale is an American musicologist and former professor at  UCLA, who has specialised in the Swedish poets Carl Michael Bellman and Olof von Dalin. He is a member of the Royal Swedish Academy of Music. He was educated at Yale University (BA 1961), Cambridge University (MA 1968), and Harvard University (PhD in Scandinavian literature 1972). He was a professor at UCLA from 1970 to his retirement in 2006.

Works

References

External links
 Website (UCLA)

American musicologists
Living people
Harvard University alumni
Yale University alumni
Year of birth missing (living people)
Carl Michael Bellman scholars